{{DISPLAYTITLE:C28H32N2O}}
The molecular formula C28H32N2O (molar mass: 412.57 g/mol, exact mass: 412.2515 u) may refer to:

 Phenylfentanyl
 3-Phenylpropanoylfentanyl
 4-Phenylfentanyl

Molecular formulas